Hans Kjeld Rasmussen (born 10 November 1954 in Glostrup, Hovedstaden) is a Danish sport shooter and Olympic champion. He won a gold medal in skeet shooting at the 1980 Summer Olympics in Moscow.

References

External links
 

1954 births
Living people
People from Glostrup Municipality
Danish male sport shooters
Skeet shooters
Olympic shooters of Denmark
Olympic gold medalists for Denmark
Olympic medalists in shooting
Shooters at the 1976 Summer Olympics
Shooters at the 1980 Summer Olympics
Medalists at the 1980 Summer Olympics
Sportspeople from the Capital Region of Denmark